You Caught Me Out is the second and final studio album by Tracey Ullman. It was released on Stiff Records in November 1984 throughout Europe. Unlike her 1983 debut album, this album was never released commercially in the United States.

Background
The album contained covers of two Kirsty MacColl songs (who had written and originally recorded Ullman's 1983 smash "They Don't Know"), including the title track and "Terry". MacColl had originally written "Terry" specifically for Ullman to record, but first recorded it herself in 1983 at the behest of the record company (both singers were signed to Stiff Records at the time). Ullman's version the following year used the same backing track as MacColl's original, but simply swaps MacColl's vocals for Ullman's. MacColl also provided backing vocals on the album.

Four singles were taken from the album in the UK. "My Guy's Mad At Me" (a cover of Madness's 1980 hit "My Girl's Mad At Me") peaked at no.23 in March 1984, while "Sunglasses" (a cover of the 1965 Skeeter Davis hit) peaked at no.18 in August. However, "Helpless" and "Terry" (one of Ullman's two Kirtsy MacColl covers on the album) failed to prolong her brief run of Top 40 hits, peaking at 61 and 81 respectively. "You Caught Me Out" was also released as a single in Japan.

Reception
The album was a critical and commercial flop, peaking at no.92 on the UK Album Chart. In a scathing review in Smash Hits magazine, Lisa Anthony gave the album a rare score of 1 out of 10 and opined "Tracey Ullman has a unique talent for picking the most obscure 1960s B-side and ruining it. Here she trudges through old Dusty Springfield and Tamla Motown songs, amongst others, in a Pinky and Perky voice that isn't a patch on the originals. Frankly, it all seems like a big waste of time."

Track listing

Personnel
Musicians – Andy Richards, B.J. Cole, Charlie Morgan, Chris Wyles, Dave Land, Deon Estus, Don Snow, Doug Taylor, Fred Percer, Gavin Povey, Geraint Watkins, Graham Edwards, Jakko M. Jakszyk, Joe Partridge, John Canham, Judd Lander, Mark Nevin, Pandit Dinesh, Paul Westwood, Paul "Wix" Wickens, Richard Edwards, Robin Bolt, Roger McKew, Simon Edwards, Steve Bloomfield, Stewart Curtis, Terry Williams
Backing vocalists – Alison Thomas, Joy Yates, Katie Kissoon, Kay Garner, Kirsty MacColl, Mandy Dickinson, Margot Buchanan, Peter Collins, Ruby James, Shirley Lewis

Chart performance

References

External links
 Tracey Ullman – You Caught Me Out on Discogs

Tracey Ullman albums
1984 albums
Albums produced by Peter Collins (record producer)
Stiff Records albums